Lata Mondal (born 16 January 1993) is a Bangladeshi cricketer who plays for the Bangladesh national women's cricket team. She plays as a right-handed batter and right-arm medium bowler.

Early life and background
Mondal was born on 16 January 1993 in Dhaka, Bangladesh.

Career
Mondal was a member of the team that won a silver medal in cricket against the China national women's cricket team at the 2010 Asian Games in Guangzhou, China.

Mondal made her ODI debut against Ireland on 26 November 2011.

Mondal made her T20I debut against Ireland on 28 August 2012. In October 2018, she was named in Bangladesh's squad for the 2018 ICC Women's World Twenty20 tournament in the West Indies.

In November 2021, she was named in Bangladesh's team for the 2021 Women's Cricket World Cup Qualifier tournament in Zimbabwe. In January 2022, she was named in Bangladesh's team for the 2022 Commonwealth Games Cricket Qualifier tournament in Malaysia. Later the same month, she was named in Bangladesh's team for the 2022 Women's Cricket World Cup in New Zealand.

References

External links
 
 

1993 births
Living people
Cricketers from Dhaka
Bangladeshi Hindus
Bangladeshi women cricketers
Bangladesh women One Day International cricketers
Bangladesh women Twenty20 International cricketers
Dhaka Division women cricketers
Rangpur Division women cricketers
Rajshahi Division women cricketers
Eastern Zone women cricketers
Cricketers at the 2010 Asian Games
Asian Games medalists in cricket
Cricketers at the 2014 Asian Games
Asian Games silver medalists for Bangladesh
Medalists at the 2010 Asian Games
Medalists at the 2014 Asian Games